Boletus occidentalis is a species of bolete fungus in the family Boletaceae. Found growing under Pinus occidentalis in Jarabacoa, Dominican Republic, it was described as new to science in 2007.

See also
List of Boletus species

References

External links

occidentalis
Fungi described in 2007
Fungi of the Caribbean